"Get It Tonight" is a song recorded by American singer and songwriter Erika Jayne featuring rapper Flo Rida. The single was released through a joint venture with Pretty Mess Records and New Nation Live label, distributed by Universal Music Group. The song was produced by Vassal Benford, whose credits include The Jets, Diplo, Toni Braxton and Jonas Blue.

"Get It Tonight" received generally favorable reviews from contemporary music critics, most of whom praised the song's lyrics and Erika Jayne's vocals on the track. "Get It Tonight" reached number 13 on the Dance/Electronic Streaming Songs chart. Marenah Dobin of Bustle called "Get It Tonight" the "perfect party song."

Background 
"Flo Rida is great. He’s a great performer and a really nice guy. We had a lot of fun on the video set. He’s one cool dude. I’ve never had a feature before and it was really great that we got to have him on the record. It really helped bring awareness to me, my brand, and to my stuff. I’m really thankful for that. The song is cute. It’s about gettin’ it tonight. And I think everybody should get it tonight," Jayne told 303 magazine in 2013.

Music video 
Erika Jayne released the lyric video for the song on February 14, 2013. A music video for "Get It Tonight" was released on May 7, 2013 and directed by Mikey Minden. The video begins with Flo Rida performing his rap while Jayne dances around him seductively. Other scenes include Jayne by herself singing the verses.

Track listing

Charts

Release history

References 

2013 singles
2013 songs